Bangladesh Police Football Club (also known as Bangladesh Police Athletic Club) is an association football team based in Dhaka, Bangladesh. The club was founded by Bangladesh Police. The services team had previously played in the Senior Division Football League in 1998 – then the second tier of football. In recent times, Police FC became champions of the Second Division Football League in 2014 to get promotions to the First Division before making their debut in the Bangladesh Championship League in 2015. Police FC gained the promotion to Bangladesh Premier League for the very first time in the club's history by becoming champion of the 2018-19 Bangladesh Championship League.

History

BCL era

Nicolas Vitorović era
On 4 August 2019, Police FC appointed Cypriot Nicolas Vitorović as their first-ever foreign head coach for the upcoming season.
On 31 December 2019, Bangladesh Police Football Club reached the semi-final of the Federation Cup for the first time, after beating a shaky Saif Sporting Club 3–1 in the third quarter-final.

Shirt sponsors

Current squad
Bangladesh Police FC squad for 2021–22 season.

Current technical staff

Team records

Head coach's record

Honours

League
 Bangladesh Championship League
Winners (1): 2018–19
 Second Division Football League
Winners (1): 2013–14

Controversy 
On 24 May 2019, The police constable, Shamim, assaulted BFF's competition manager Zaber Bin Ansari after being denied entry into the ground during that match against Feni Soccer Club. Later, four more players joined him in the assault, just after the completion of the prize-giving ceremony at the Bangabandhu National Stadium. All four police players – Amirul Islam, Tarek Aziz, Azmi Omar, and Sarwar Hossain – have been given Tk one lakh fine for their involvement. Islam and Aziz have been suspended for two matches while Omar and Hossain have been handed nine-match bans each. Physiotherapist of the team, Santanu Mallik, too, has been banned for nine matches and fined Tk 2 lakh.

Constable Shamim has been given life-time stadium ban across the country.

Notable players
Had international caps for their respective countries whilst playing for Bangladesh Police FC.

Asia
 Amredin Sharifi (2021–)

North America
 Sidney Rivera (2019–20)

References

External links 
 Bangladesh Police FC at Mycujoo

Bangladesh Police
Football clubs in Bangladesh